The language known today as Spanish or previously known as Castilian derived from a dialect of spoken Latin, which was brought to the Iberian Peninsula by the Romans after their occupation of the peninsula that started in the late 3rd century BC. After evolving and improving for centuries, today with over 483 million native speakers, it is the world’s 4th most spoken language, after English, Mandarin Chinese and Hindi. Influenced by the peninsular hegemony of Al-Andalus in the early middle ages, Hispano-Romance varieties borrowed substantial lexicon from Arabic. Upon the southward territorial expansion of the Kingdom of Castile, Hispano-Romance norms associated to this polity displaced both Arabic and the Mozarabic romance varieties in the conquered territories, even though the resulting speech also assimilated features from the latter in the process. The first standard norm of Spanish was brought forward in the 13th century by Alfonso X the Wise (who replaced Latin with Castilian as language of the administration), probably drawing from the speech of the upper classes of Toledo. Features associated with the Castilian patterns of Hispano-Romance also spread west and east to the kingdoms of León and Aragón for the rest of the middle ages, owing to the political prestige achieved by the Kingdom of Castile in the peninsular context and to the lesser literary development of their vernacular norms. From the 1560s onward the standard written form followed Madrid's.

The Spanish language expanded overseas in the Early Modern period in the wake of the Spanish conquests in the Americas (as well as the Canary Islands). Besides the Caribbean, the colonial administration in the new territories had its main centres of power located in Mexico City and Lima, which retained more features from the central peninsular norm than other more peripheral territories of the Spanish empire, where adoption of patterns from the southern peninsular norm of Seville (the largest city of the Crown in the 16th century and the port linking to the Americas) was more pervasive, even though in other regards the influence from the latter norm (associated to Andalusian Spanish) came to be preponderant in the entire Americas. Spanish varieties henceforth borrowed influence from Amerindian languages, primarily coming from the Caribbean, the Central-Andean and Mesoamerican regions. Today it is the official language of 20 countries, as well as an official language of numerous international organizations, including the United Nations.

Main distinguishing features 
The development of Spanish phonology is distinguished from those of other nearby Romance languages (e.g. Portuguese, Catalan) by several features:
 diphthongization of Latin stressed short E and O in closed syllables as well as open (puerta vs. Portuguese )
Also in Gascon: , huelha)
 early fricativization of palatal  (from Vulgar Latin -LJ-, -CL-, -GL-), first into palatal  and ultimately into velar , e.g., filius →hijo, *oc'lu →  ojo, * → cuajar; cf. Portuguese filho, olho, coalhar)
 development of initial PL-, CL-, FL- into palatal  in many words, e.g., plorare → llorar, clamare → llamar, flamma →  llama; cf. Portuguese chorar, chamar, chama, Catalan )

The following features are characteristic of Spanish phonology and also of some other Ibero-Romance languages, but not the Romance languages as a whole:

The Latin system of four verb conjugations (form classes) is reduced to three in Spanish.  The Latin infinitives with the endings -ĀRE, -ĒRE, and -ĪRE become Spanish infinitives in -ar, -er, and -ir respectively.  The Latin third conjugation—infinitives ending in -ĔRE—are redistributed between the Spanish -er and -ir classes (e.g. facere → hacer, dicere → decir).
Spanish verbal morphology continues the use of some Latin synthetic forms that were replaced by analytic ones in spoken French and (partly) Italian (cf. Sp. lavó, Fr. il a lavé), and the Spanish subjunctive mood maintains separate present and past-tense forms.

Spanish syntax provides overt marking for some direct objects (the so-called "personal a", see differential object marking for the general phenomenon), and uses clitic doubling with indirect objects, in which a "redundant" pronoun (le, les) appears even in the presence of an explicit noun phrase. (Neither feature occurs in other Western Romance languages, but both are features of Romanian, with pe < PER corresponding to Spanish a.) With regard to subject pronouns, Spanish is a pro-drop language, meaning that the verb phrase can often stand alone without the use of a subject pronoun (or a subject noun phrase). In some cases, such as with impersonal verbs referring to meteorological (llover, to rain; nevar, to snow) or other natural phenomena (amanecer, to get light out; anochecer, to get dark out), it is ungrammatical to include a subject.  Compared to other Romance languages, Spanish has a somewhat freer syntax with relatively fewer restrictions on subject-verb-object word order.

Due to prolonged language contact with other languages, the Spanish lexicon contains loanwords from Basque, Hispano-Celtic (Celtiberian and Gallaecian), Iberian, Germanic (Gothic), Arabic and indigenous languages of the Americas.

Accents—used in Modern Spanish to mark the vowel of the stressed syllable in words where stress is not predictable from rules—came into use sporadically in the 15th century, and massively in the 16th century. Their use began to be standardized with the advent of the Spanish Royal Academy in the 18th century. See also Spanish orthography.

External history 

The standard Spanish language is also called Castilian in its original variant, and in order to distinguish it from other languages native to parts of Spain, such as Galician, Catalan, Basque, etc. In its earliest documented form, and up through approximately the 15th century, the language is customarily called Old Spanish.  From approximately the 16th century on, it is called Modern Spanish.  Spanish of the 16th and 17th centuries is sometimes called "classical" Spanish, referring to the literary accomplishments of that period.  Unlike English and French, it is not customary to speak of a "middle" stage in the development of Spanish.

Origins 
Castilian Spanish originated (after the decline of the Roman Empire) as a continuation of spoken Latin in several areas of northern and central Spain. Eventually, the variety spoken in the city of Toledo around the 13th century became the basis for the written standard. With the Reconquista, this northern dialect spread to the south, where it almost entirely replaced or absorbed the local Romance dialects, at the same time as it borrowed many words from Andalusi Arabic and was influenced by Mozarabic (the Romance speech of Christians living in Moorish territory) and medieval Judaeo-Spanish (Ladino). These languages had vanished in the Iberian Peninsula by the late 16th century.

The prestige of Castile and its language was propagated partly by the exploits of Castilian heroes in the battles of the Reconquista—among them Fernán González and Rodrigo Díaz de Vivar (El Cid)—and by the narrative poems about them that were recited in Castilian even outside the original territory of that dialect.

The "first written Spanish" was traditionally considered to have appeared in the Glosas Emilianenses located in San Millán de la Cogolla, La Rioja. These are "glosses" (translations of isolated words and phrases in a form more like Hispanic Romance than Latin) added between the lines of a manuscript that was written earlier in Latin. Nowadays the language of the Glosas Emilianenses is considered to be closer to the Navarro-Aragonese language than to Spanish proper. Estimates of their date vary from the late 10th to the early 11th century.

The first steps toward standardization of written Castilian were taken in the 13th century by King Alfonso X of Castile, known as Alfonso el Sabio (Alfonso the Wise), in his court in Toledo. He assembled scribes at his court and supervised their writing, in Castilian, of extensive works on history, astronomy, law, and other fields of knowledge.

Antonio de Nebrija wrote the first grammar of Spanish, Gramática de la lengua castellana, and presented it, in 1492, to Queen Isabella, who is said to have had an early appreciation of the usefulness of the language as a tool of hegemony, as if anticipating the empire that was about to be founded with the voyages of Columbus.

Because Old Spanish resembles the modern written language to a relatively high degree, a reader of Modern Spanish can learn to read medieval documents without much difficulty.

The Spanish Royal Academy was founded in 1713, largely with the purpose of standardizing the language. The Academy published its first dictionary in six volumes over the period 1726–1739, and its first grammar in 1771, and it continues to produce new editions of both from time to time.  (The Academy's dictionary is now accessible on the Internet.)  Today, each of the Spanish-speaking countries has an analogous language academy, and an Association of Spanish Language Academies was created in 1951.

America 
Beginning in the late fifteenth century, the discovery and colonization of the Americas by Spanish explorers brought the language across the Atlantic and to Mexico, Central America, and western and southern South America. Under the Spanish Crown, the language was used as a tool for colonization by Spanish soldiers, missionaries, conquistadors, and entrepreneurs. In the coming centuries, their descendants continued to spread the language.

Use of the language in the Americas was continued by descendants of the Spaniards:  Spanish criollos and Mestizos. After the wars of independence fought by these colonies in the 19th century, the new ruling elites extended their Spanish to the whole population, including the Amerindian majority, to strengthen national unity, and nowadays it is the first and official language of the resulting republics, except in very isolated parts of the former Spanish colonies.

In the late 19th century, the still-Spanish colonies of Cuba and Puerto Rico encouraged more immigrants from Spain, and similarly other Spanish-speaking countries such as Argentina,  Uruguay, and to a lesser extent Chile, Colombia, Mexico, Panama and Venezuela, attracted waves of European immigration, Spanish and non-Spanish, in the late 19th and early 20th centuries. There, the countries' large (or sizable minority) population groups of second- and third-generation descendants adopted the Spanish language as part of their governments' official assimilation policies to include Europeans. In some countries, they had to be Catholics and agreed to take an oath of allegiance to their chosen nation's government.

When Puerto Rico became a possession of the United States as a consequence of the Spanish–American War, its population—almost entirely of Spanish and mixed Afro-Caribbean/Spanish (mulatto and mestizo) descent—retained its inherited Spanish language as a mother tongue, in co-existence with the American-imposed English as co-official. In the 20th century, more than a million Puerto Ricans migrated to the mainland U.S. (see Puerto Ricans in the United States).

A similar situation occurred in the American Southwest, including California, Arizona, New Mexico and Texas, where Spaniards, then criollos (Tejanos, Californios, etc.) followed by Chicanos (Mexican Americans) and later Mexican immigrants, kept the Spanish language alive before, during and after the American appropriation of those territories following the Mexican–American War. Spanish continues to be used by millions of citizens and immigrants to the United States from Spanish-speaking countries of the Americas (for example, many Cubans arrived in Miami, Florida, beginning with the Cuban Revolution in 1959, and followed by other Latin American groups; the local majority is now Spanish-speaking). Spanish is now treated as the country's "second language," and over 5 percent of the U.S. population are Spanish-speaking, but most Latino/Hispanic Americans are bilingual or also regularly speak English.

Africa 
The presence of Spanish in Equatorial Guinea dates from the late 18th century, and it was adopted as the official language when independence was granted in 1968.

Spanish is widely spoken in Western Sahara, which was a protectorate/colony of Spain from the 1880s to the 1970s.

Judaeo-Spanish 
In 1492 Spain expelled its Jewish population.  Their Judaeo-Spanish language, called Ladino, developed along its own lines and continues to be spoken by a dwindling number of speakers, mainly in Israel, Turkey, and Greece.

In the Pacific 
In the Marianas, the Spanish language was retained until the Pacific War, but is no longer spoken there by any significant number of people. As part of Chile since 1888, Spanish is spoken by most people in Easter Island along with Rapa Nui language.

Spain 
Language politics in Francoist Spain declared Spanish as the only official language in Spain, and to this day it is the most widely used language in government, business, public education, the workplace, cultural arts, and the media. But in the 1960s and 1970s, the Spanish parliament agreed to allow provinces to use, speak, and print official documents in three other languages: Catalan for Catalonia, Balearic Islands and Valencia; Basque for the
Basque provinces and Navarre, and Galician for Galicia. Since 1975, following the death of Franco, Spain has become a multi-party democracy and decentralized country, constituted in autonomous communities. Under this system, some languages of Spain—such as Aranese (an Occitan language of northwestern Catalonia), Basque, Catalan/Valencian, and Galician—have gained co-official status in their respective geographical areas. Others—such as Aragonese, Asturian and Leonese—have been recognized by regional governments.

International projection 
When the United Nations organization was founded in 1945, Spanish was designated one of its five official languages (along with Chinese, English, French, and Russian; a sixth language, Arabic, was added in 1973).

The list of Nobel laureates in Literature includes eleven authors who wrote in Spanish (José Echegaray, Jacinto Benavente, Gabriela Mistral, Juan Ramón Jiménez, Miguel Ángel Asturias, Pablo Neruda, Vicente Aleixandre, Gabriel García Márquez, Camilo José Cela, Octavio Paz, and Mario Vargas Llosa).

Influences

The mention of "influences" on the Spanish language refers primarily to lexical borrowing. Throughout its history, Spanish has accepted loanwords, first from pre-Roman languages (including Basque, Iberian, Celtiberian and Gallaecian), and later from Greek, from Germanic languages, from Arabic, from neighboring Romance languages, from Native American languages, and from English.

The most frequently used word that entered Spanish from (or through) Basque is  "left". Basque is perhaps most evident in some common Spanish surnames, including García and Echeverría. Basque place names also are prominent throughout Spain, because many Castilians who took part in the Reconquista and repopulation of Moorish Iberia by Christians were of Basque lineage. Iberian and Celtiberian likewise are thought to have contributed place names to Spain. Words of everyday use that are attributed to Celtic sources include camino "road", carro "cart", colmena "hive", and cerveza "beer". Suffixes such as -iego: mujeriego "womanizer" and -ego: gallego "Galician" are also attributed to Celtic sources.

Influence of Basque phonology is credited by some researchers with softening the Spanish labiodentals:  turning labiodental  to bilabial , and ultimately deleting labiodental . Others negate or downplay Basque phonological influence, claiming that these changes occurred in the affected dialects wholly as a result of factors internal to the language, not outside influence. It is also possible that the two forces, internal and external, worked in concert and reinforced each other.

Some words of Greek origin were already present in the spoken Latin that became Spanish. Additionally, many Greek words formed part of the language of the Church. Spanish also borrowed Ancient Greek vocabulary in the areas of medical, technical, and scientific language, beginning as early as the 13th century.

The influence of Germanic languages is very little on phonological development, but rather is found mainly in the Spanish lexicon. Words of Germanic origin are common in all varieties of Spanish. The modern words for the cardinal directions (norte, este, sur, oeste), for example, are all taken from Germanic words (compare north, east, south and west in Modern English), after the contact with Atlantic sailors. These words did not exist in Spanish prior to the 15th century. These older words for "east" and "west" continue to have some use in Modern Spanish.

In 711 the Iberian Peninsula was invaded by Moors, who brought in the Arabic language. For about eight hundred years, until the fall of the Emirate of Granada (1492), Spanish borrowed thousands of words from Andalusi Arabic, such as alcalde "mayor", álgebra "algebra", aceite "oil", zanahoria "carrot", alquiler "rent", achacar "to blame", adelfa "oleander", barrio "neighbourhood", chaleco "vest", to name just a few; making up 8% of the Spanish dictionary—the second largest lexical influence on Spanish after Latin. It is thought that the bilingualism of the Mozarabs facilitated the large transfer of vocabulary from Arabic to Castilian.

The neighboring Romance languages—such as Galician/Portuguese, Catalan, French, and Occitan—contributed greatly to the Spanish lexicon throughout the Middle Ages and into the modern era. Borrowing from Italian occurred most frequently in the 16th and 17th centuries, due largely to the influence of the Italian Renaissance.

The creation of the Spanish Empire in the New World led to lexical borrowing from indigenous languages of the Americas, especially vocabulary dealing with flora, fauna, and cultural concepts unique to the Americas.

Borrowing from English has become especially strong, beginning in the 20th century, with words borrowed from many fields of activity, including sports, technology, and commerce.

The incorporation into Spanish of learned, or "bookish" words from its own ancestor language, Latin, is arguably another form of lexical borrowing through the influence of written language and the liturgical language of the Church. Throughout the Middle Ages and into the early modern period, most literate Spanish-speakers were also literate in Latin; and thus they easily adopted Latin words into their writing—and eventually speech—in Spanish. The form of Latin that Spaniards spoke and the loanwords came from was Classical Latin, but also Renaissance Latin, the form of Latin used in original works of the time.

Internal history
Spanish shares with other Romance languages most of the phonological and grammatical changes that characterized Vulgar Latin, such as the abandonment of distinctive vowel length, the loss of the case system for nouns, and the loss of deponent verbs.

Syncope
Syncope in the history of Spanish refers to the loss of an unstressed vowel from the syllable immediately preceding or following the stressed syllable.  Early in its history, Spanish lost such vowels where they preceded or followed R or L, and between S and T.

*Solitario, which is derived from sōlitārium, is a learned word; cf. the alternate form soltero. As also "fábula" from "fabulam", although this last one has a different meaning in Spanish.

Later, after the time of intervocalic voicing, unstressed vowels were lost between other combinations of consonants:

Words capital, computar, hospital, recitar and vindicar are learned words; cf. capitālem, computāre, hospitālem, recitāre, and vindicāre and alternate forms caudal, contar, hostal, rezar, and vengar.

Elision
While voiceless intervocalic consonants regularly became voiced, many voiced intervocalic stops (d, g, and occasionally b) were dropped from words altogether through a process called elision.

Many forms with d and g preserved, e.g. ligar, legal, dígito, crudo, are learned words (Latinisms); cf. the alternate forms liar, leal, dedo and Old Spanish cruo and its Latin origin crūdus.

An exemption to the rule: The retention of the d and g is due to the invalidity of the -ao, -aa, -oo, and -oa hiatuses in Old Spanish that would result from dropping it.

Voicing and spirantization
Although it was once speculated that this change came about as a transfer of phonological features from substrate Celtic and Basque languages, which were in geographical proximity to Iberian Vulgar Latin (see Sprachbund), it is now widely recognized that such change is a natural internal development.

1Latin superāre produced both sobrar and its learned doublet superar.

2Latin lucrum produced both logro and its learned doublet lucro.

The verb decir, in its various conjugated forms, exemplifies different phonetic changes, depending on whether the letter <c> (Latin ) was followed by a front vowel or not. This also is the pattern of a few other Spanish verbs ending in -cer or -cir, as in the table below:

Diphthongization in open and closed syllables
It is commonly thought that the reflexes of stressed short E and O of Latin were realised, after the loss of phonemic quantity, as the low-mid vowels /ɛ/ and /ɔ/ respectively in the Western Romance languages, contrasting with close-mid /e/ and /o/, which would have originated from the mergers between long E and short I and between long O and short U, respectively; this change would explain the similarity of the vowel systems in modern Romance languages such as Portuguese, Catalan and Italian. These low-mid vowels subsequently would have undergone diphthongization in many of the Western Romance languages. In Spanish this change occurs regardless of syllable shape (open or closed), in contrast to French and Italian, where it takes place only in open syllables, and in greater contrast to Portuguese where this diphthongization does not occur at all. As a result, Spanish phonology exhibits a five-vowel system, not the seven-vowel system that is typical of many other Western Romance languages.

Learned words and consonant cluster simplification
Learned words—that is, "bookish" words transmitted partly through writing and thus affected by their Latin form—became increasingly frequent with the works of Alfonso X in the mid-to-late 13th century.  Many of these words contained consonant clusters which, in oral transmission, had been reduced to simpler consonant clusters or single consonants in previous centuries.  This same process affected many of these new, more academic, words, especially when the words extended into popular usage in the Old Spanish period.  Some of the consonant clusters affected were -ct-, -ct[i]-, -pt-, -gn-, -mn-, -mpt-, and -nct-.  Most of the simplified forms have since reverted to the learned forms or are now considered to be uneducated.

Most of these words have modern forms which more closely resemble Latin than Old Spanish. In Old Spanish, the simplified forms were acceptable forms which were in coexistence (and sometimes competition) with the learned forms.  The Spanish educational system, and later the Real Academia Española, with their demand that all consonants of a word be pronounced, steadily drove most simplified forms from existence.  Many of the simplified forms were used in literary works in the Middle Ages and Renaissance (sometimes intentionally as an archaism), but have since been relegated mostly to popular and uneducated speech. Occasionally, both forms exist in Modern Spanish with different meanings or in idiomatic usage: for example afición is a 'fondness (of)' or 'taste (for)', while afección is 'illness';  Modern Spanish respeto is '(attitude of) respect', while con respecto a means 'with regard to'.

Most words with consonant clusters in syllable-final position are loanwords from Classical Latin, examples are: transporte , transmitir , instalar , constante , obstante , obstruir , perspectiva , istmo . A syllable-final position cannot be more than one consonant (one of n, r, l, s or z) in most (or all) dialects in colloquial speech, reflecting Vulgar Latin background.

Another type of consonant cluster simplification involves "double" (geminate) plosives that reduced to single: -pp-, -tt-, -cc-, -bb-, -dd-, -gg-  > -p-, -t-, -c-, -b-, -d-, -g- .

Vocalization
The term "vocalization" refers to the change from a consonant to the vowel-like sound of a glide.  Some syllable-final consonants, regardless of whether they were already syllable-final in Latin or brought into that position by syncope, became glides.  Labials (b, p, v) yielded the rounded glide  (which was in turn absorbed by a preceding round vowel), while the velar c produced the palatal glide  (which could palatalize a following  and be absorbed by the resulting palatal affricate).  (The forms debda, cobdo, and dubdar are documented in Old Spanish; but the hypothetical forms *oito and *noite had already given way to ocho and noche by the time Castilian became a written language.)

Betacism

Most Romance languages have maintained the distinction between a phoneme  and a phoneme : a voiced bilabial stop and a voiced, usually labiodental, fricative, respectively. Instances of the  phoneme could be inherited directly from Latin  (unless between vowels), or they could result from the voicing of Latin  between vowels. The  phoneme was generally derived either from an allophone of Latin  between vowels or from the Latin phoneme corresponding to the letter ⟨v⟩ (pronounced  in Classical Latin but later fortified to the status of a fricative consonant in Vulgar Latin). In most Romance-speaking regions,  had labiodental articulation, but in Old Spanish, which still distinguished /b/ and /v/, the latter was probably realized as a bilabial fricative . The contrast between the two phonemes was neutralized in certain environments, as the fricative  also occurred as an allophone of /b/ between vowels, after a vowel, and after certain consonants in Old Spanish. The similarity between the stop  and fricative  resulted in their complete merger by the end of the Old Spanish period (16th century). The same situation prevails in northern Portuguese dialects and in Galician, but the other Portuguese dialects maintain the distinction.

In Modern Spanish, from the 16th century onward, the choice of orthographic ⟨b⟩ or ⟨v⟩ depends mainly on the etymology of the word. The orthography attempts to mimic the Latin spelling, rather than to keep the pronunciation-based spelling of Old Spanish. Thus, Old Spanish bever "to drink", bivir/vivir "to live" become beber, vivir, respectively, following the Latin spelling bibere, vīvere. The Spanish placename Córdoba, often spelled Cordova in Old Spanish (the spelling that prevailed in English until the 20th century), now reflects the spelling used by the city's Roman founders, "Corduba".

Latin f- to Spanish h- to null

It is thought that ⟨f⟩ represented the labiodental  in Latin, which underwent a series of lenitions to become, successively, bilabial  and then glottal  (hence the modern spelling), and it was then lost altogether in most varieties; ⟨h⟩ is assumed to have been "silent" in Vulgar Latin. The first written evidence of the process dates from 863, when the Latin name Forticius was written as Ortiço, which might have been pronounced with initial  but certainly not . (The same name appears as Hortiço in a document from 927.) Rather, ⟨f⟩ was consistently used to represent  until the phoneme  reappeared in the language (around the 16th century, as a result of loanwords from Classical Latin). Then, it became necessary to distinguish both phonemes in spelling.

Since much of this area was historically bilingual with Basque, and Basque once had  but no , it is often suggested that the change was caused by Basque influence. However, this is contested by many linguists.

Most current instances of ⟨f⟩ are either learned words (those influenced by their written Latin form, such as forma, falso, fama, feria), loanwords of Arabic and Greek origin, or words whose initial ⟨f⟩ in Old Spanish is followed by a non-vowel (⟨r⟩, ⟨l⟩, or the glide element of a diphthong), as in frente, flor, fiesta, fuerte. That, along with the effect of preservation of  regionally (Asturian fumu 'smoke', formiga 'ant', fégadu 'liver'), accounts for modern doublets such as Fernando (learned) and Hernando (inherited) (both Spanish for "Ferdinand"), fierro (regional) and hierro (both "iron"), fastidio and hastío (both Spanish for "boredom"), and fondo and hondo (fondo means "bottom" and hondo means "deep"). Also, hacer ("to make") is the root word of satisfacer ("to satisfy"), and hecho ("made") is the root word of satisfecho ("satisfied") (cf. malhechor and fechorías)

As mentioned above,  was not lost in all varieties. The distribution of this pronunciation throughout so much of western Spain suggests that its spread was due in large part to the role of eastern Asturians in the reconquest of these zones.

Fabulāri is translated as "make stories", opposed to its Spanish derivative hablar which means "speak" or "to talk".

Silent Latin h-
'H' is originally pronounced in Classical Latin, but became silent in Vulgar Latin. Thus, words were spelled without any such consonant in Old Spanish; in Modern Spanish, from the 16th century onward, it attempts to mimic the Latin spelling rather than continue Old Spanish orthography.

Modern development of the Old Spanish sibilants

The character ⟨ç⟩, called ⟨c⟩ cedilla, originated in Old Spanish but has been replaced by ⟨z⟩ in the modern language.

Additionally, the affricate  lost its stop component, to become a laminodental fricative, . The distinction between the sounds grew in the dialects of northern and central Spain by paradigmatic dissimilation, but dialects in Andalusia and the Americas merged both sounds.

The dissimilation in the northern and central dialects occurred with the laminodental fricative moving forward to an interdental place of articulation, losing its sibilance to become . The sound is represented in modern spelling by ⟨c⟩ before ⟨e⟩ or ⟨i⟩ and by ⟨z⟩ elsewhere. In general, coastal regions of Andalusia preferred , and more inland regions preferred  (see the map at ceceo).

During the colonization of the Americas, most settlers came from the south of Spain; that is the cause, according to almost all scholars, for nearly all Spanish-speakers in the New World still speaking a language variety derived largely from the Western Andalusian and Canarian dialects.

Meanwhile, the alveopalatal fricative , the result of the merger of voiceless  (spelled ⟨x⟩ in Old Spanish) with voiced  (spelled with ⟨j⟩ in some words and in others with ⟨g⟩ before ⟨e⟩ or ⟨i⟩), was moved backwards in all dialects, to become (depending on geographical variety) velar , uvular  (in parts of Spain) or glottal  (in Andalusia, Canary Islands, and parts of the Americas, especially the Caribbean region).

Interchange of the liquids /l/ and /r/
One unusual feature of Spanish etymology is the way in which the liquids  and  have sometimes replaced each other in words derived from Latin, French and other sources. For example, Spanish milagro, "miracle", is derived from Latin miraculum. Here is an incomplete list of such words:

 ancla, "anchor", Latin ancora
 albedrío, "will, whim, fancy", Latin arbitrium, "judgment, decision, will" (arbitrio is a learned form, i.e.: loanword from Classical Latin)
 algalia, "catheter",  ergaleía, "tools"
 alimaña, "pest", Latin, animalĭa, "animals"
 alma, "soul", Latin anima
 alondra, "lark", Latin alaudula
 altramuz, "lupin", Hispanic Arabic at-tarmūs
 árbol, "tree", Latin arbor
 Argelia, "Algeria (nation)"
 azufre, sulfur, Latin sulphur
 azul, "blue",  lāzaward "lapis lazuli" (cf. medieval Latin azura, French azure)
 blandir, "to brandish", French brandir
 bolsa, "bag, purse", Latin bursa
 cárcel, "prison", Latin carcer (cf. English "incarcerate")
 calambre, "cramp, electric shock", French crampe
 Catalina, Latin Catharina (proper name; Catarina is a learned form; i.e. loanword from Classical Latin)
 chaflán, "chamfer", French chanfrein.
 cilantro, "coriander", Latin coriandrum
 cimbrar, "shake (a stick), sway, swish", Latin cymula, "sprout, shoot (of plant)"
 coronel, "colonel", French colonel, from Italian colonnello
 Cristóbal, Germanic Christoffer, from Latin Christopherus (proper name)
 cuartel, "quarter", French quartier
 dintel, "lintel", Old French lintel
 escolta, "escort", Italian scorta
 espuela, "spur", Gothic *spaúra (cf. French éperon)
 estrella, "star", from Latin stella (cf. Italian stella, French étoile)
 flete, "freight, cargo", French fret
 fraile, "friar", Provençal fraire, from Latin frater, "brother"
 franela, "flannel", French flanelle
 frasco, "flask", Germanic flasko
 guirnalda, "garland", older Spanish guirlanda, cf. French guirlande
 golondrina, "swallow (bird)", Latin hirundo
 lirio, "lily, iris", Latin lilium
 mármol, "marble", Latin marmor
 miércoles, "Wednesday", Latin Mercuri [dies], "Mercury's [day]"
 milagro, "miracle", Latin miraculum
 nivel, "level", Latin libellum, "little balance", from libra, "balance"
 olor, "smell, scent", Latin odor
 papel, "paper", Catalan paper, Latin papyrus
 palabra, "word", Latin parabola
 peligro, "danger", Latin periculum (cf. English "peril")
 plática, "chat, conversation", Latin practica
 quilate, "carat",  qīrāṭ "carat" <       "carob seed" (cf. Italian carato)
 recluta, "recruit", French recrute
 regaliz(a), "liquorice", Late Latin liquiritia
 roble, "oak", Latin robur, "strong"
 silo, "silo", Latin sirus from Greek siros, "pit for storing grain"
 surco, "groove, furrow", Latin sulcus
 taladro, "drill", Latin tarātrum < Celtic tarātron
 temblar, "tremble", Latin tremulāre
 templar, "temper, warm up", Latin temperō"
 tiniebla(s), "darkness", Latin tenebraeYeísmo

Documents from as early as the 15th century show occasional evidence of sporadic confusion between the phoneme  (generally spelled ⟨y⟩) and the palatal lateral  (spelled ⟨ll⟩).  The distinction is maintained in spelling, but in most dialects of Modern Spanish, the two have merged into the same, non-lateral palatal sound. Thus, for example, most Spanish-speakers have the same pronunciation for haya (from the verb haber) as for halla (from hallar). The phonemic merger is called yeísmo, based on one name for the letter ⟨y⟩.

Yeismo is a trait of the Andalusian dialect, among others. Since more than half of the early settlers of Spanish America came from Andalusia, most Spanish-speaking regions of the Americas have yeísmo, but there are pockets in which the sounds are still distinguished. Native-speakers of neighboring languages, such as Galician, Astur-Leonese, Basque, Aragonese, Occitan and Catalan, usually do not feature yeísmo in their Spanish since those languages retain the  phoneme.

Rioplatense Spanish (of Argentina and Uruguay) is particularly known for the pronunciation  of both  and original . A further development, the unvoiced pronunciation , during the second half of the twentieth century came to characterize the speech of "most younger residents of Buenos Aires" and continues to spread throughout Argentina.

See also
Cantar de Mio Cid
Hispano-Celtic languages
Iberian language
Iberian Romance languages
Influences on the Spanish language
List of Spanish words of Indigenous American Indian origin
List of Spanish words of Philippine origin
List of English words of Spanish origin
Romance languages
Spanish dialects and varieties
Spanish phonology
Old Spanish language
Paleohispanic languages
Middle Spanish
Vulgar Latin
Rafael Lapesa

References

Sources

External links
 An explanation of the development of Medieval Spanish sibilants in Castile and Andalusia.
A recording of the sibilants, as they would have been pronounced in medieval Spanish.
A History of the Spanish language (sample from the second edition, 2002), by Ralph Penny
Tesoro de los diccionarios históricos de la lengua española 
Linguistic Time Machine  Check the historic evolution of Latin words to modern Spanish.

 
Spanish